Cartier is a family of serif old style typefaces designed in 1967 by Carl Dair, who was commissioned by the Governor General of Canada-in-Council to create a new and distinctively Canadian typeface. The first proof of Cartier (in Roman and Italic faces) was published as "the first Canadian type for text composition" to mark the centenary of Canadian Confederation.

In 1977 a revival of Cartier was produced under the name Raleigh by Robert Norton.

This typeface was later redesigned by Canadian typographer Rod McDonald in a digital format. McDonald's Cartier family removed inconsistencies in the baseline weight, and streamlined the stroke angles to enforce a strong horizontal flow. His work was a form of homage to the validity of Dair's original design, which was incomplete and plagued with weight, stroke, and grid issues because Dair insisted that the type foundry not refine the face.

References

Government typefaces
Old style serif typefaces
Canadian Centennial
Photocomposition typefaces
Digital typefaces
Typefaces and fonts introduced in 1967